Photinia loriformis is a species in the family Rosaceae. They are common in China.

References

loriformis